The Trakia University or Thrace University (Trakiyski universitet) is a Bulgarian university in the city of Stara Zagora. It was named after the historical region of Thrace and was established in 1995.

The university organizes training on programs with four educational and qualification degrees:  Bachelor, Master and PhD, as well as on programs for qualification and post-graduate training in the system of lifelong education. Whilst the university has been teaching in the local languages for a number of years, it has recently started teaching  in English in the majors Medicine and Veterinary Medicine.

Trakia University is accredited by the National Assessment and Accreditation Agency at the Council of Ministers. A diploma with the relevant certification level is issued.

Faculties 
 Faculty of Agriculture with training experimental base
 Faculty of Veterinary Medicine with clinics
 Faculty of Medicine
 Faculty of Pedagogy
 Faculty of Engineering and Technology (former Technical College - Yambol)
 Faculty of Economic
Faculty of Education
 Medical College, Stara Zagora
 Department for information in-service teacher training
 Affiliate- Haskovo
 University Hospital

References 

 
1995 establishments in Bulgaria
Educational institutions established in 1995